Wuruma Dam was constructed across the Nogo River in the upper Burnett River Catchment 48km north-west of Eidsvold for irrigation & town water supply for Eidsvold, Mundubbera and Gayndah. The dam wall is of mass concrete gravity construction which cost $5.3m to build and was completed in 1968. It has a surface area when full of 1,639 hectares (4,048 acres), and a capacity of 165,400 ML. The dam takes its name from a local indigenous word meaning brahminy kite. 

After reaching a low of 0.03% in September 1970, Wuruma Dam overflowed for the first time in February 1971. Since construction the dam has overflowed 9 times.

It recorded its highest level of 142.64% capacity (3.74m over the spillway) in January 2013 as a result of heavy rains from ex Tropical Cyclone Oswald.

SunWater is undertaking a dam spillway capacity upgrade program to ensure the highest level of safety for our dams is maintained. The spillway will be upgraded in the longer term.

Fishing
A Stocked Impoundment Permit is required to fish in the dam.

See also

List of dams and reservoirs in Australia

References

Reservoirs in Queensland
North Burnett Region
Dams in Queensland